The Prince of Wales Ground, also known as Prince's Ground, in Brighton, Sussex was the venue for top-class cricket matches in the closing years of the 18th century.

Location
The ground was on a site now occupied by Park Crescent and its surroundings. The land was originally donated to the Brighton Cricket Club by the then Prince of Wales. His patronage helped Brighton to become a powerful club that sparked a revival in the fortunes of Sussex cricket which lasted well into the 19th century.

Matches
Only four first-class cricket matches were played at the ground. All of them took place between September 1791 and September 1792.

Aftermath
As the towns of Brighton and Hove developed, the land was sold a few years later and the cricket club moved to a new site in Brighton at Temple Fields, which was where Montpelier Crescent is now.

The Brighton club was representative of Sussex as a county and it ultimately became the main instrument in the formation of Sussex County Cricket Club in 1839. From July 1814 the club occupied the Royal New Ground (also known as Thomas Box's Ground), another Brighton venue, which was used for 49 first-class matches until September 1847 and was the county ground for Sussex in its early years.  From 1848 to 1871, Sussex used the Royal Brunswick Ground in Brighton, also known as C H Gausden's Ground.  Since 1872, the club has been based at the County Cricket Ground, Hove.

References and notes

Further reading
 Derek Birley, A Social History of English Cricket, Aurum, 1999
 G B Buckley, Fresh Light on 18th Century Cricket, Cotterell, 1935
 Arthur Haygarth, Scores & Biographies, Volume 1 (1744-1826), Lillywhite, 1862
 Timothy J McCann, Sussex Cricket in the Eighteenth Century, Sussex Record Society, 2004

1791 establishments in England
Cricket grounds in Sussex
Defunct cricket grounds in England
Defunct sports venues in East Sussex
English cricket venues in the 18th century
Sports venues completed in 1791
Sports venues in Brighton and Hove